Seppo Reijonen (born 29 April 1944) is a Finnish ski jumper. He competed in the large hill event at the 1968 Winter Olympics. Reijonen later moved to Sweden, and he also represented Sweden in competitions.

Notes

References

1944 births
Living people
Finnish male ski jumpers
Olympic ski jumpers of Finland
Ski jumpers at the 1968 Winter Olympics
People from Sortavala
Finnish emigrants to Sweden
Swedish male ski jumpers
Swedish people of Finnish descent